David Haward Bain (born February 23, 1949) is an American writer of nonfiction, a lecturer, an editor, and was a longtime instructor in literature and creative writing at Middlebury College. Bain has been affiliated with the Bread Loaf Writers' Conference since 1980. He is also a lifelong musician. Bain is primarily known for his work of narrative history, Empire Express: Building the First Transcontinental Railroad; a historical travel memoir, The Old Iron Road: An Epic of Roads, Rails, and the Urge to Go West; and an earlier braided historical/travel work, Sitting In Darkness: Americans in the Philippines. He is a fellow in the Society of American Historians.

Work overview

 
Empire Express: Building the First Transcontinental Railroad has been reviewed positively by Wall Street Journal, Washington Post Book World, Kirkus Reviews, Denver Post, and Hartford Courant. It has been named A New York Times Notable Book; one of Library Journal Best Books 1999; Main Selection, Book of the Month Club, History Book Club; Finalist, Los Angeles Times Book Award; Finalist, Francis Parkman Prize; National Railway & Locomotive History Society Award; New England Historical Association Book Award; The American Experience: Transcontinental Railroad documentary, PBS.

The Old Iron Road: An Epic of Rails, Roads, and the Urge to Go West has been reviewed positively by Los Angeles Times, Verlyn Klinkenborg of the New York Times Book Review, and Chicago Tribune. It was named a Book Sense Travel Literature Bestseller.

Sitting In Darkness: Americans in the Philippines has been reviewed positively by New York Times Book Review, Publishers Weekly, Library Journal, and Philadelphia Inquirer, and was awarded the Robert F. Kennedy Memorial Book Prize, 1985.

Bitter Waters: America’s Forgotten Naval Exploring Mission to the Dead Sea, 1848 has been reviewed positively by American Library Association Booklist, Roanoke VA Times, History Book Club, and Kirkus Reviews.

Early life

Bain was born in Camden, New Jersey, last home of Walt Whitman (Bain wrote about it in a long-form essay, "Camden Bound: Going Home After a Lifetime of Absence.") His parents were David Bain, a sales manager for RCA (Radio Corporation of America), selling broadcasting equipment after pre-war years in radio engineering and announcing across the South, and Rosemary Haward Bain, who gave up a career in on-air radio in her native Kansas City to concentrate on marriage and family. They had four children; David Haward Bain was the eldest. He and siblings Terry Bain, Christopher Bain, and Lisa Bain, were raised in Haddonfield and Westmont, New Jersey; Takoma Park and Chevy Chase, Maryland; and finally in Port Washington, Long Island, New York. Bain graduated from Boston University in 1971, majoring in journalism and political science and writing for three campus newspapers. His most influential professors were Norman B. Moyes and Howard Zinn, and he received a Hearst Award for Excellence in Newswriting on the topic of anti-war protests in the Vietnam era.

Work history

In 1973 in New York City, Bain began working in the editorial departments of several book publishers, including Alfred A. Knopf (during the early Robert Gottlieb years), Stonehill, Crown Publishers/Harmony Books (when it was still a downtown family business), and Houghton Mifflin (New York), as well as doing projects at Macmillan Inc. and other firms and on staff at the first American Book Awards. Among the writers with whom he worked in these apprentice years were Alistair Cooke (America), Richard Kluger (Simple Justice), Robert Caro (The Power Broker), Jonathan Spence (Emperor of China), Martin Amis (The Rachel Papers), Shere Hite (The Hite Report), and Carolyn Heilbrun (Lady Ottoline’s Album).

Writing career

Bain became a full-time writer in 1978, beginning his first book, Aftershocks, and thereupon contributing many articles and reviews to The New York Times, the New York Times Book Review (to date, 32 reviews), Newsday (15), the Philadelphia Inquirer (22), Washington Post Book World, Los Angeles Times Book Review, and articles and essays in Smithsonian, American Heritage, TV Guide, Glamour, Kenyon Review, Prairie Schooner, and a number of travel magazines.

Books

Forbidden City: Family Secrets, Covert Love, and a Mysterious Death and Cover-Up on Legation Street, Peking, 1940. Forthcoming.

Big Payoff: The Kidnapping of Mary McElroy: A Kansas City Chronicle of Greed, Corruption, and the Power of Love in the Great American Depression. Forthcoming.

The Girl Widow Unveiled: Unraveling Dark Secrets in an American Family, longform personal/historical essay, Ebook, BookBaby, released under colophon of Gideon Abbey Press, 2013.

Mighty Good Road: Writings on Railroads, the West, and American History, ebook. Thirty-seven essays, talks, and reviews. Ebook, all platforms, released under colophon of Gideon Abbey Press, 2011.

Camden Bound: Going Home After a Lifetime of Absence, long-form stand-alone essay. Ebook, all platforms, released under colophon of Gideon Abbey Press, 2011.

Bitter Waters: America’s Forgotten Naval Mission to the Dead Sea, 1848 (Overlook Press, 2011; ebook, 2012).

The Old Iron Road: An Epic of Rails, Roads, and the Urge to Go West (Viking Press, 2004; Penguin, 2005; ebook forthcoming from Gideon Abbey Press)

Empire Express: Building the First Transcontinental Railroad (Viking Press, 1999; Penguin, 2000; ebook, 2010).

The College on the Hill: A Browser's History for the Bicentennial, Middlebury College Press (cloth), October 1999.

Whose Woods These Are: The Bread Loaf Writers’ Conference, 1926–1992 (The Ecco Press, 1993).

Sitting In Darkness: Americans in the Philippines (Houghton Mifflin, 1984; Penguin, with new material, 1986; Ebook, with newer material, 2013, BookBaby under colophon of Gideon Abbey Press). Received a Robert F. Kennedy Memorial Book Prize, 1985.

Aftershocks: A Tale of Two Victims (Methuen, 1980; Penguin, with new material, 1986). FN {http://www.middlebury.edu/academics/enam/faculty/node/40761]

Selected essays

"Camden Bound: Going Home After a Lifetime of Absence." Personal/literary essay about Camden, NJ. (Walt Whitman deathplace; present author's birthplace). Prairie Schooner, Fall 1998. Selected for The Best of Prairie Schooner Essays (ed. Raz & Flaherty), U. Nebraska Press, 2000. Ebook, released under colophon of Gideon Abbey Press, 2013.

"The House on Hemenway Hill," essay, Prairie Schooner, Winter 1996. Reader's Choice Award, 1997. Among year's top 100 essays selected by series editor Robert Atwan for consideration in The Best American Essays 1997.

"A House and a Household: Sinclair Lewis and Dorothy Thompson," Kenyon Review, Summer 1989. Reprinted in Pack and Parini (eds.), The Bread Loaf Anthology of Contemporary American Essays, University Press of New England, 1989.

"Augusto Sandino: The Man Who Made the Yanquis Go Home," American Heritage, August–September 1985. Reprinted in Andrew C. Kimmens (ed.), Nicaragua and the United States, H.W. Wilson, 1987. Reprinted in Bain, Mighty Good Road: Writings on Railroads, the West, and American History, 2011 ebook.

"Joseph Battell," chapter in A History of Ripton, Vermont: The Story of a Green Mountain Town, 1781–1981, by Charles A. Billings. Niche Arts, 2019.

Series of 5 "place" essays in Middlebury Magazine, 2012–2013, 2018. "The Observer: Inside the Halls of Science," Middlebury Magazine, Summer 2012; "The Observer: Middlebury Institute for International Studies at Monterey," Middlebury Magazine, Fall 2012; "The Observer: Davis Library," Middlebury Magazine, Winter 2013; "The Observer: Mahaney Arts Center," Middlebury Magazine, Spring 2013; "The Observer: Gamaliel Painter Hall,"  MiddWire, Fall 2018.

"Frost at Bread Loaf," Burlington Free Press, June 29, 2012.

"Letter From Manila: How the Press Helped to Dump a Despot," Columbia Journalism Review, May–June 1986. COVER.

"Frederick Funston: The Acerbic Warrior," Smithsonian Magazine, May 1989. FN

Selected authored reviews

"Appetite for America: How Visionary Businessman Fred Harvey Built a Railroad Hospitality Empire That Civilized the Wild West" (Stephen Fried), review, Philadelphia Inquirer, January 2010.

"American Massacre: The Tragedy of Mountain Meadows (Sally Denton)," review, New York Times Book Review, September 27, 2003.

"Zephyr: Tracking a Dream Across America (Henry Kisor)," review, New York Times Book Review, 20 March 1994.

"The Civil War in the American West (Alvin M. Josephy, Jr.)," review, New York Times Book Review, 8 March 1992.

"In Our Own Image: America’s Empire in the Philippines (Stanley Karnow)," review,  Philadelphia Inquirer, March 1989. FRONT PAGE.

"Blowback: America’s Recruitment of Nazis and Its Effect on the Cold War (Christopher Simpson)," review, Newsday, May 1988.

"Union Pacific: Birth of a Railroad (Maury Klein), Philadelphia Inquirer, 27 December 1987.

"Waltzing With a Dictator: The Marcoses and the Making of American Policy (Raymond Bonner)," review, Newsday, 17 May 1987. FRONT PAGE.

"Corazon Aquino (Lucy Komisar)," review, Los Angeles Times Book Review, 10 May 1987. FRONT PAGE.

"War Without Mercy: Race and Power in the Pacific War (Fred Dower)," review, Philadelphia Inquirer, 13 July 1986. FRONT PAGE.

"The Good War: An Oral History of World War Two (Studs Terkel)," review, Philadelphia Inquirer, 21 October 1984. FRONT PAGE.

"The Spanish War: An American Epic, 1898 (G. O'Toole)," review, St. Petersburg Times, 21 October 1984.

"Endless Enemies: The Making of an Unfriendly World  (Jonathan Kwitny)," review, Philadelphia Inquirer, 7 October 1984.

"The Passionate War: Narrative History of the Spanish Civil War (Peter Wyden)," review, Philadelphia Inquirer, 17 July 1983. FRONT PAGE.

"Widows (Ariel Dorfman)," review, Philadelphia Inquirer'', 10 July 1983. FRONT PAGE. FN

Teaching career

Following his fellowship year (1980) at Middlebury College's annual Bread Loaf Writers’ Conference on its Ripton campus in the Green Mountains of Vermont, Bain was named to the conference faculty for ten subsequent years, thereafter serving terms on the admissions board and other committees; designated the Bread Loaf Historian in the mid-1980’s, he has lectured annually at the conference for many years.

In 1987, Bain joined the faculty at Middlebury College in Vermont, with the Creative Writing Program in the English and American Literatures Department, as lecturer, part-time, and ultimately as senior lecturer, for 32 years. Also, he was an affiliate with the Environmental Studies Program. Bain retired in June 2019.

Personal life

Bain married the painter Mary Smyth Duffy in 1981; she died in 2002. He has two children. He is partnered with Linda Fotheringill.

References

1949 births
Living people
Middlebury College faculty
21st-century American writers
American editors
Boston University alumni